Sir Geers Henry Cotterell, 3rd Baronet (22 August 1834 – 17 March 1900) was a Whig politician.

Early life
Cotterell was the second son of Sir John Henry Cotterell (who had died before his birth and was heir apparent to Sir John Cotterell, 1st Baronet) and Hon. Pyne Jesse Trevor, daughter of Henry Trevor, 21st Baron Dacre and Pyne Crosbie. After his father's death, his mother married Granville Harcourt Vernon, MP, son of Most Rev. Edward Venables-Vernon-Harcourt and Lady Anne Leveson-Gower, in 1845.

He was educated at Harrow School and Christ Church, Oxford, and succeeded to the Baronetage of Garnons on 17 February 1847, upon the death of his brother John Henry Cotterell.

Career
Cotterell was elected Whig MP for Herefordshire at the 1857 general election and held the seat until 1859, when he stood down.

Outside of politics, Cotterell was High Sheriff of Herefordshire in 1863, as well as a Deputy Lieutenant and a Justice of the Peace for the same county.

Personal life
He married in 1865 Honorable Katherine Margaret Airey, daughter of Richard Airey, 1st Baron Airey, and Harriet Mary Evard Talbot. The Hon. Lady Cotterell died in 1896. They had at least three children:

 John Richard Geers Cotterell (1866–1937), who married Lady Evelyn Gordon-Lennox, daughter of Charles Gordon-Lennox, 7th Duke of Richmond, in 1896.
 Alice Cotterell (d. 1924), who died unmarried.
 Louisa Cotterell.

Cotterell died in Hertford Street, Mayfair, on 17 March 1900 and was succeeded in the baronetcy by his son, John.

References

External links
 

Whig (British political party) MPs for English constituencies
UK MPs 1857–1859
1834 births
1900 deaths
Baronets in the Baronetage of the United Kingdom
High Sheriffs of Herefordshire
Deputy Lieutenants of Herefordshire
English justices of the peace